Neothauma  is a genus of freshwater snail with a gill and an operculum,  an aquatic gastropod mollusc in the subfamily Bellamyinae  of the family Viviparidae.

Species
 Neothauma jouberti Bourguignat, 1888 
 † Neothauma jupadwongaensis Musalizi, 2017
 Neothauma tanganyicense E. A. Smith, 1880 
Taxa inquirenda
 Neothauma bridouxianum Grandidier, 1885 
 Neothauma servainianum Grandidier, 1885 
Species brought into synonymy
 Neothauma bicarinatum Bourguignat, 1885: synonym of Neothauma tanganyicense var. bicarinatum Bourguignat, 1885
 Neothauma ecclesi Pain & Crowley, 1964: synonym of Bellamya ecclesi (Crowley & Pain, 1964) (original combination)
 Neothauma giraudi Bourguignat, 1885: synonym of Neothauma tanganyicense E. A. Smith, 1880 (junior synonym)

Distribution 
This freshwater snail is only found in Lake Tanganyika, where it is the largest gastropod, and occurs in all four of the bordering countries — Burundi, the Democratic Republic of the Congo, Tanzania, and Zambia — although fossil shells have been discovered at Lake Edward and in the Lake Albert basin.

The type locality is the East shore of Lake Tanganyika, at Ujiji.

History 

The genus Neothauma previously contained several species, but most were reassigned to other genera.

Description 

Ecology 
There is conflicting information relating to its feeding behavior, with one study referring to it as a detritus-feeder, another saying that it actively preys on endobenthic organisms, and finally that it feeds on particulate organic filtered while the snail is buried.

The shells of dead Neothauma tanganyicense often form carpets over large areas, and are used by a number of other animals, such as cichlid fish (shell dwellers), and freshwater crabs of the genus Platythelphusa. Juvenile snails live in the sediment in order to avoid predators.

References

External links

 Bourguignat (1890), "Histoire malacologique du Lac Tanganika (Afrique equaltoriale)"

Viviparidae
Gastropods described in 1880
Monotypic gastropod genera
Taxa named by Edgar Albert Smith
Taxonomy articles created by Polbot
Snails of Lake Tanganyika